Christopher Redvers Green (December 12, 1899 – July 25, 1966) was a Canadian professional ice hockey left winger.

Career 
Green played six seasons in the National Hockey League for the Hamilton Tigers, New York Americans and Boston Bruins. He won the Stanley Cup in 1929 with the Boston Bruins. Green was born in Sudbury, Ontario.

Personal life 
Green's older brother Shorty Green was also a hockey player in the NHL.

Career statistics

Regular season and playoffs

See also
List of players with 5 or more goals in an NHL game

External links
Red Green's Obituary at losthockey.com

1899 births
1966 deaths
Boston Bruins players
Canadian ice hockey left wingers
Hamilton Tigers (ice hockey) players
Ice hockey people from Ontario
New York Americans players
Sportspeople from Greater Sudbury
Stanley Cup champions
Place of death missing